(10 March 1926 – 7 June 2021) full name , was a Japanese martial artist. He was a long time shihan (Teaching Master) of Tenshin Shōden Katori Shintō-ryū bujutsu, which he learned as a disciple of the previous teaching master Hayashi Yazaemon (1892-1964) from the time he entered the school in 1942 at the age of 16. In 1967, when Otake-sensei was 42 years old, he received gokui kaiden, the highest level of attainment in the tradition, and at the same time became the school's teaching master. He lived and taught in rural location near Narita city, in Chiba Prefecture of Japan. The teachings of Tenshin Shōden Katori Shintō-ryū were designated an Intangible Cultural Asset of Chiba Prefecture in 1960, with Ōtake designated as guardian of the tradition.

He authored Strategy and the Art of Peace, as well as an earlier three-volume set of books on the tradition entitled The Deity and the Sword: Katori Shinto-ryu.

He was a member of the Chiba Prefecture Board of Registrars and Appraisers for Muskets and Swords; a position he held since 1979.
Ōtake shihan died on 7 June 2021.

Books by Risuke Ōtake
 Ōtake, Risuke (1977). The Deity and the Sword - Katori Shinto-ryu Vol. 1, Japan, Japan Publications Trading Co.  (Original Japanese title for all three volumes in this series is Mukei Bunkazai Katori Shinto-ryu)
 Ōtake, Risuke (1977). The Deity and the Sword - Katori Shinto-ryu Vol. 2, Japan, Japan Publications Trading Co. 
 Ōtake, Risuke (1977). The Deity and the Sword - Katori Shinto-ryu Vol. 3, Japan, Japan Publications Trading Co. 
 Ōtake, Risuke (2007). Katori Shinto-ryu: Warrior Tradition, Koryu Books.  (A total revamp of the earlier The Deity and the Sword book)
 Ōtake, Risuke. Le Sabre et le Divin, 
 Ōtake, Risuke. (2016) Strategy and the Art of Peace, Tenshinshō-den Katori Shintō-ryū, Nippon Budokan, ISBN 978-4-583-10984-8 C0075

Documentaries 
 BBC Documentary, The Way of the Warrior, BBC, 29 June 1983
 John Wate, Le katana, sabre de samouraï, Arte Doc, 2005
 Nihon No Ken Jutsu, Gakken, 30 January 2008,
 "REAL SAMURAI" NHK World TV22 June 2014

 Eat Your Enemy (Scarabeefilms, 2005)

Further reading
The following books also mention Katori Shinto-ryū and Ōtake-sensei:
 Draeger, Donn F. (1973): Classical Bujutsu : The Martial Arts And Ways Of Japan, Vol. 1, Weatherhill. New York. USA.
 Draeger, Donn F. (1973): Classical Budo: The Martial Arts and Ways of Japan, Vol. 2, Weatherhill. New York. USA.

References

1926 births
2021 deaths
Japanese swordfighters
People from Chiba Prefecture